Dracaena ombet, commonly known as Gabal Elba dragon tree, is a species of plant belonging to the Asparagaceae family, formerly included in the Ruscaceae. It is found in northeastern Africa and the western Arabian Peninsula.

Description 
It is a tree that reaches a size of 2-8 m in height, with a forked trunk, produces a red resin. The leaves form dense rosettes at the ends of the branches, these are linear with a broad base, 40-60 x up to 3 cm, gradually tapering to the tip that is sharp, thick and rigid, with smooth margins, flat to concave in the top. The inflorescence is panicle-shaped, 0.5 m long, highly branched, glabrous or pubescent, with tiny, ovate-lanceolate bracts . Whitish tepals, 4-6 mm long, linear. Stamens somewhat shorter than tepals; flattened filaments. The fruit in the form of berries 10-12 mm in diameter.

Distribution 
It is found at an altitude of 1000-1800 m in Djibouti, Eritrea, Ethiopia, Somalia, Sudan and Saudi Arabia.

Taxonomy 
Dracaena ombet was described by Heuglin ex Kotschy & Peyr. and published in Plantae tinneanae sive descriptio plantarum in ... 47, in 1867.

References

Bibliography  
 BOULOS, L. (1995). Flora of Egypt. Checklist. Al-Hadara Publishing, Cairo. 283 p. [p.]
 BOULOS, L. (2005). FLORA OF EGYPT. [vol. 4] Al Harara Publishing. Cairo. [p.83]

ombet
Flora of Northeast Tropical Africa
Flora of Saudi Arabia